Lamud is a town in northern Peru, capital of Luya Province in Amazonas Region.

References

Populated places in the Amazonas Region